Boksum is a village in Waadhoeke municipality in the province of Friesland, the Netherlands. It had a population of around 400 people in 2020 Before 2018, the village was part of the Menameradiel municipality.

Overview 
The village was first mentioned in the 13th century as Boxum, and means "settlement of Bokke or Bokse". Boksum was a terp (artificial living hill) village with a radial structure which dates from before Christ. It was built close to the Middelzee. The Dutch Reformed church has elements from the 12th century, and enlarged several times. The tower collapsed in 1842, and was rebuilt in 1843 using the stones of the previous tower.

On 17 January 1586, the last battle of the Dutch Revolt in Friesland was fought near Boksum. The Spanish won the battle, and an estimated 1,000 Dutch soldiers died, however the ice had started to melt and the easy passage to the capital Leeuwarden over the ice was no longer an option.

Boksum was home to 237 people in 1840. The terp was partially excavated in 1869.

It has a bakery, a community center and two churches. The oldest of the two churches is still used as a church belonging to the Dutch Reformed Church. The elementary school in  used to teach three language: Dutch, West Frisian and English, but closed in 2019 due the lack of students and moved in at the elementary school in Deinum, a village right beside Boksum

Gallery

References

External links
 Website about Boksum

Waadhoeke
Populated places in Friesland